Dehnow-e Kasurak (also Romanized as Dehnow-e Kasūrak) is a village in Gavkan Rural District, in the Central District of Rigan County, Kerman Province, Iran. At the 2006 census, its population was 171, in 40 families.

References 

Populated places in Rigan County